Keith's Chapel, also known as Mr Keith's Chapel and the May Fair Chapel, was a private chapel in Curzon Street, Mayfair, Westminster, operated by the 18th century Church of England clergyman Alexander Keith.

Keith had been the first incumbent of the Church of England's new Curzon Chapel, built in Curzon Street in 1730, where he began to perform marriages without either banns or license until he was excommunicated by an ecclesiastical court in 1742. Keith then went to prison and remained there for several years. However, he quickly established his own private chapel very near to his old one on Curzon Street, where he and his curates continued clandestine marriages until 1754, when the Marriage Act 1753 came into effect.

The marriages at Keith's Chapel were perfectly lawful, as until 1754 the only indispensable element of a marriage in England was a Church of England clergyman. At its height, some six thousand marriages a year were taking place at the chapel.

The chapel's business was promoted by frequent advertisements in newspapers, such as this one in the Daily Post dated 20 July 1744: 

When his wife died in January 1750, Keith combined the announcement of her death in the Daily Advertiser with an advertisement for his chapel's services.

Notable weddings
 
The chapel's weddings included 
Duke of Kingston and Elizabeth Chudleigh (bigamously)
Henry Brydges, 2nd Duke of Chandos and Anne Jeffrey, 1744
Lord Strange and Lucy Smith, 1746
Lord Kensington and Rachel Hill, 1749
Sewellis Shirley and Margaret Rolle, widow of the Earl of Oxford, 1751
James Hamilton, 6th Duke of Hamilton and Miss Gunning, 1752 (married with a bed-curtain-ring half an hour after midnight)
Lord George Bentinck and Mary Davies, 1753

References

Chapels in London
Marriage, unions and partnerships in England
18th century in London
Buildings and structures in Mayfair